Gymnopilus earlei is a species of mushroom in the family Hymenogastraceae.

Description

Habitat and distribution
Gymnopilus earlei has been found on coconut logs in Jamaica, during October to November.

See also

List of Gymnopilus species

References

External links
Gymnopilus earlei at Index Fungorum

earlei
Fungi of North America
Taxa named by William Alphonso Murrill